Ducklington is a village and civil parish on the River Windrush  south of Witney in West Oxfordshire. The 2011 Census recorded the parish's population as 1,581.

History
Ducklington is one of the earliest Saxon parishes to be recorded in Oxfordshire. In a charter of 958 King Edgar the Peaceful granted at Duclingtun to his Minister, Eanulf. An Anglo-Saxon charter from 1036 also records the toponym as Duclingtun, and another Anglo-Saxon document from 1044 records it as Ducelingdun. The Domesday Book of 1086 records it as Dochelintone and a charter from 1130 records it as Dukelindona.  The name is derived from Old English. The first element may be from the name of a person called Ducca or Ducel. The element "-ing" most commonly means "people of". The element "-tūn" means an enclosure, homestead or village. The fact that the village has a duck pond with a population of ducks is purely incidental.  After the Norman Conquest Ducklington was held by Robert D'Oyly, a Norman nobleman who took part in William I's conquest of England. The Dyve family then held the Lordship of Ducklington throughout the 13th and 14th centuries, living there until early in the reign of Edward III.  

The Church of England parish church of Saint Bartholomew is 12th century. The Gothic Revival architect EG Bruton restored the building in 1871.  The bell tower has a ring of six bells. William and Henry III Bagley of Chacombe in Northamptonshire cast the second, fourth and fifth bells in 1708. Robert Taylor & Sons cast the tenor bell in 1829, presumably at their then foundry in Oxford. Mears and Stainbank of the Whitechapel Bell Foundry cast the treble bell in 1889. The Royal Eijsbouts bell foundry of Asten in the Netherlands cast the third bell in 1988.  The village had a Baptist Chapel until 2016, when it was converted into a private home.  The former village schoolhouse was built in 1858. The modern Ducklington Church of England Primary School is across the village green from the original site.

Natural history
Ducklington is notable for the rare fritillary flower (mainly of the snake's head variety), many of which grow in a specially designated meadow just outside the village. Before the Second World War many fritillaries had grown on fields all over the Windrush Valley. However, the national drive for food production during the war meant that most meadows were intensively ploughed, the rivers dredged, and consequently the fritillaries were lost. Only the current fritillary field happened to be left unploughed. The flowers have survived with help from both locals and farmers. Once a year, the local community celebrates Fritillary Sunday when the field, parish church and hall are opened so that the public may walk among and enjoy the flowers.

Amenities
Ducklington has a Morris dancing side and Mummers performances. It also has its own Morris Dance tradition; its own style of dance that was collected around the beginning of the 19th century. The Ducklington tradition is danced by many sides throughout Britain and the United States.  Ducklington has one public house: The Bell, and a sports and social club. Ducklington has hosted several flower and garden shows.  The former tithe barn is now the village hall, which has been renovated in the last few years. It is used by village groups including the Parish Council and is the parish polling station in local and national elections. Ducklington has a Women's Institute.

Sports
Ducklington Sports and Social Club has several cricket and football teams. They include three men's football teams that compete in the Witney and District League. Ducklington's football first XI is in the Witney and District Premier Division. The club has nine boys' teams. The cricket section has one adult teams and three youth teams.

References

Sources

External links

Civil parishes in Oxfordshire
Sites of Special Scientific Interest in Oxfordshire
Villages in Oxfordshire
West Oxfordshire District